Charles Blenzig (born August 12, 1958) is an American jazz pianist, composer, arranger, producer, and educator.

In the mid 1980s Blenzig joined the Gil Evans Monday Night Orchestra that performed weekly at Sweet basil Jazz Club. Blenzig has performed with Michael Brecker, Marcus Miller, Bill Evans, Hiram Bullock, Lew Soloff, Kenwood Dennard, Eddie Gómez, Dave Weckl, Joe Locke, Harvey Mason, Joe Beck, and Italian rapper Jovanotti

He has been musical director for singer-songwriter Michael Franks since 1990 and for Latin jazz saxophonist Gato Barbieri. He has toured extensively throughout the world as a leader and sideman, including South Africa, Indonesia, Thailand, Japan, Republic of Georgia, Europe, and Korea.

He is a member of the Purchase Conservatory Jazz Department faculty with Jon Faddis, Hal Galper, and Todd Coolman.

Discography

As leader
 Charles Blenzig (Chase Music Group, 1989)
 Say What You Mean (Big World Music, 1993)
 Certain Standards (Truspace Records, 1997)
 It's About Time (Double-Time, 2003)

As guest 
 New York Cats, Fabio Mogera (Alpha Music, 2014)
 A Kid's Christmas – Julia Blenzig (K Records, 2013)
 Perfect Sky – JY Lee (Truespace, 2012)
 Time Together – Michael Franks (Shanachie, 2011)
 Oh Yea – Jovanatti & Soleluna NY Lab (Verve, 2010)
 Turnaround – Michael Treni (Bell Productions, 2009)
 Detour Jazz Composers Workshop Orchestra (2008)
 Sakura – Vinnie Cutro (Royal Music Ensemble, 2008)
 Strange Energies – Blenzig, Renzi, Villani (Callgola, 2007)
 Rendezvous in Rio – Michael Franks (Koch, 2006)
 Local Dialect – Jay Azzolina (Garagista Music, 2006)
 Asianergy – Jack Lee (Truspace, 2005)
 Wild Terry Silverlight (Terry Silverlight Music, 2004)
 Watching the Snow – Michael Franks (Sleeping Gypsy Music, 2003)
 Close Your Eyes – Mike Fahn (Sparky Productions, 2002)
 The Spirit Within – Ricky Sebastian  (STR Digital, 2002)
 New York Sketch – Jack Lee (TruSpace Music, 2001)
 Bewitching – Toku (SME, 2001)
 Past Tense – Jay Azzolina (Doubletime , 2000)
 Barefoot on the Beach – Michael Franks (Windham Hill, 1999)
 Where My Heart Goes – Jack Lee (TruSpace, 1998)
 Walk Your Dogma – Mike Pope (Walk Your Dogma Music, 1996)
 Live in Europe – Bill Evans (Lipstick, 1995)
 Gracefulee – Jack Lee (Polydor, 1994)
 Grove Island – Takeshi Itoh (East West, 1994)
 Flight of the Spirit – Norman Headman (Monad, 1994)
 Just Advance – Kenwood Dennard (Big World, 1992)

References

American jazz pianists
American male pianists
American music arrangers
American jazz composers
Record producers from New York (state)
American percussionists
American music educators
State University of New York faculty
Living people
People from Pelham, New York
1958 births
20th-century American pianists
Jazz musicians from New York (state)
21st-century American pianists
American male jazz composers
20th-century American male musicians
21st-century American male musicians
Double-Time Records artists